Bibhu Kumari Devi (born 28 June 1944) is the current head of the Royal Family of Tripura, Indian National Congress politician and former member of the 10th Lok Sabha.

Early life
Daughter to Raja Lav Shah, Bibhu Kumari was born on 28 June 1944 in Mussoorie (then in United Provinces). She's the daughter-in-law of Bir Bikram Kishore Debbarman and graduated from the Isabella Thoburn College in Lucknow.

Career
Devi is a member of the Indian National Congress (INC) and entered the Tripura Legislative Assembly in 1983. The same year she was included in the All India Congress Committee. From 1989 to 1991, she served as the Minister for Revenue and Local Self-Government in the Tripura state government, when the INC made her its candidate for the 1991 general elections from Tripura East constituency reserved for scheduled tribes. She defeated Baju Ban Riyan of the Communist Party of India (Marxist) to become a member of the 10th Lok Sabha.

In 1998, Devi refused to contest the Tripura legislative elections after the INC fielded her for the Matabari seat.

Personal life
Devi married the last King of Tripura, Kirit Bikram Kishore Deb Barman from whom she had one son and two daughters. Her husband and son Kirit Pradyot Deb Barman were also members of the INC. In 2015, a local court in Tripura ordered the state government to hand over Neermahal palace and Rudrasagar Lake to Devi.

References

1994 births
Living people
Women members of the Lok Sabha
Lok Sabha members from Tripura
India MPs 1991–1996
People from Mussoorie
People from Agartala
Isabella Thoburn College alumni
Indian National Congress politicians from Tripura
Tripura MLAs 1988–1993
Tripuri people
Indian Hindus